The 1936–37 FA Cup was the 62nd season of the world's oldest football cup competition, the Football Association Challenge Cup, commonly known as the FA Cup. Sunderland won the competition for the first time, beating Preston North End 3–1 in the final at Wembley.

Matches were scheduled to be played at the stadium of the team named first on the date specified for each round, which was always a Saturday. Some matches, however, might be rescheduled for other days if there were clashes with games for other competitions or the weather was inclement. If scores were level after 90 minutes had been played, a replay would take place at the stadium of the second-named team later the same week. If the replayed match was drawn further replays would be held until a winner was determined. If scores were level after 90 minutes had been played in a replay, a 30-minute period of extra time would be played.

Calendar

First round proper
At this stage 43 clubs from the Football League Third Division North and South joined the 25 non-league clubs having come through the qualifying rounds. Chester, Port Vale and Luton Town were given a bye to the Third Round. To make the number of matches up, non-league Ilford and Corinthian were given byes to this round. 34 matches were scheduled to be played on Saturday, 28 November 1936. Four were drawn and went to replays in the following midweek.

Second round proper
The matches were played on Saturday, 12 December 1936, with one match postponed until the 17th. Three matches were drawn, with replays taking place in the following midweek.

Third round proper
The 44 First and Second Division clubs entered the competition at this stage, along with Chester, Port Vale and Luton Town. The matches were scheduled for Saturday, 16 January 1937. Four matches were drawn and went to replays in the following midweek.

Fourth round proper
The matches were scheduled for Saturday, 30 January 1937. Four games were drawn and went to replays in the following midweek.

Fifth Round Proper
The matches were scheduled for Saturday, 20 February 1937. There were two replays, played in the next midweek.

Sixth Round Proper
The four quarter final ties were scheduled to be played on Saturday, 6 March 1937. The Wolverhampton Wanderers–Sunderland match went to two replays before it was settled, in Sunderland's favour. This was the only second replay to take place in the FA Cup proper.

Semi-finals
The semi-final matches were played on Saturday, 10 April 1937. Sunderland and Preston North End won their matches to meet in the final at Wembley

Final

The 1937 FA Cup Final - the first such final played in the month of May - was contested by Sunderland and Preston North End at Wembley. Sunderland won 3–1, with goals by Bobby Gurney, Raich Carter and Eddie Burbanks. Frank O'Donnell's strike on 44 minutes had put Preston ahead.

Match details

See also
FA Cup Final Results 1872-

References

General
Official site; fixtures and results service at TheFA.com
1936-37 FA Cup at rssf.com
1936-37 FA Cup at soccerbase.com

Specific

FA Cup seasons
Fa Cup, 1936-37
FA